Heck is a hamlet in the local government area of Dumfries and Galloway, Scotland.

External links

Its page in the Gazetteer for Scotland

Villages in Dumfries and Galloway